Anne Marie Martinozzi, Princess of Conti (1637 – 4 February 1672) was a French aristocrat and court official. She was a niece of King Louis XIV of France's chief minister Cardinal Mazarin, and the wife of Armand de Bourbon, Prince of Conti. She became the mother of the libertine François Louis, Prince of Conti, le Grand Conti. Her marriage to the Prince of Conti made her a princesse du Sang. She served as Surintendante de la Maison de la Reine for the queen dowager, Anne of Austria, between 1657 and 1666.

Biography
Anna Maria Martinozzi was born in Rome to Girolamo Martinozzi and Laura Margherita Mazzarini, the daughter of Pietro Mazzarini and the elder sister of Jules Mazarin, who was Cardinal and Prime Minister during the minority of Louis XIV of France.

She and her younger sister Laura were brought to France by her uncle, as were her maternal cousins, the Mancini sisters: Laura, Marie, Olympe, Hortense, and Marie Anne. The seven nieces of Cardinal Mazarin came to be known as the Mazarinettes by the French court. Mazarin managed to secure advantageous marriages for all of them. Her niece was Mary of Modena, future Queen of England.

In 1654, she married Armand de Bourbon, Prince of Conti (1629–1666). The marriage took place at the Palais du Louvre 22 February 1654.

In 1660 she and her husband began living at an hôtel on the quai Malaquais, which became known as the Hôtel de Conti. They had two sons, Louis Armand (born 1661) and François Louis (born 1664). Her husband died in 1666.

She acted as the godmother by proxy to le Grand Dauphin for Henrietta Maria of France, the dauphins own aunt (24 March 1668).

In 1670, Anne Marie exchanged her townhouse on the quai Malaquais and her beautiful country house in Bouchet for the Hôtel Guénégaud on the quai de Nevers. The house on the quai Malaquais became the Hôtel du Plessis-Guénégaud, her new house became the Hôtel de Conti, and the quai de Nevers became the quai de Conti. She died in Paris at her hôtel on the quai Conti in 1672; she was aged roughly 35. She never saw the birth of her first grandchild Marie Anne de Bourbon.

Issue
She had three children, two of whom reached adulthood:

Louis de Bourbon (Hôtel de Conti, 6 September 1658 - Hôtel de Conti, 14 September 1658)
 Louis Armand de Bourbon, Prince of Conti (Hôtel de Conti (quai Malaquais), 4 April 1661- Palace of Fontainebleau 9 November 1685)
 married Marie Anne de Bourbon, his cousin, in 1680.
 died childless at age 24; title passed to younger brother.
 François Louis de Bourbon, Prince of Conti, nicknamed Le Grand Conti (The Great Conti) (Hôtel de Conti (quai Malaquais), 30 April 1664 - Hôtel de Conti (quai Conti), 22 February 1709)
 married Marie Thérèse de Bourbon in 1680; the couple were the titular monarchs of Poland in 1697.
 had three legitimate children who survived infancy; only one of them, his only son, Louis Armand II, had children.
 had multiple affairs with both men and women; most notably with Louise-Françoise de Bourbon, wife of Louis III, Prince of Condé, who was the eldest illegitimate daughter of Louis XIV and Madame de Montespan. Marie Anne de Bourbon, the daughter of Louise-Françoise de Bourbon was thought to have been the fruit of this affair.
 descendants include: Louis-Philippe I, King of the French; the present-day pretenders to the throne of France and Italy; and the kings of Spain and Belgium.

Ancestry

See also
Mazarinettes

Notes

External links

Genealogy of her family worldroots.com
Portrait of a noblewoman thought to be the Princesse de Conti

1637 births
1672 deaths
Italian emigrants to France
Anne Marie
Anne Marie
17th-century French nobility
Anne Marie
Nobility from Rome
French ladies-in-waiting
Court of Louis XIV
Household of Anne of Austria